Ian McAdam (born 29 July 1968) is an Australian swimmer. He competed in three events at the 1988 Summer Olympics.

References

External links
 

1968 births
Living people
Australian male breaststroke swimmers
Olympic swimmers of Australia
Swimmers at the 1988 Summer Olympics
Place of birth missing (living people)
20th-century Australian people